The Kalmyks (Kalmyk: , ; ; ; archaically anglicised as Calmucks) are a Mongolic ethnic group living mainly in Russia, whose ancestors migrated from Dzungaria. They created the Kalmyk Khanate from 1635 to 1779 in the south of the European part of Russia territory. Today they form a majority in Kalmykia, located in the Kalmyk Steppe, on the western shore of the Caspian Sea.

They are the only traditionally Buddhist people whose homeland is located within Europe. Through emigration, small Kalmyk communities have been established in the United States, France, Germany, and the Czech Republic.

Origins and history

Early history of the Oirats
The Kalmyk are a branch of the Oirat Mongols, whose ancient grazing-lands spanned present-day parts of Kazakhstan, Russia, Mongolia and China. After the fall of the Mongol-led Yuan dynasty of China in 1368, the Oirats emerged as a formidable foe against the Khalkha Mongols, the Han-led Ming dynasty  and the Manchu-led Qing dynasty. For 400 years, the Oirats conducted a military struggle for domination and control over both Inner Mongolia and Outer Mongolia. The struggle ended in 1757 with the defeat of the Oirats in Dzungaria; they were the last of the Mongol groups to resist vassalage to Qing (Grousset, 1970: 502–541).

At the start of this 400-year era, the Western Mongols designated themselves as the Four Oirat. The alliance comprised four major Western Mongol tribes: Khoshut, Choros, Torghut and Dörbet. Collectively, the Four Oirat sought power as an alternative to the Mongols, who were the patrilineal heirs to Genghis Khan. The Four Oirat incorporated neighboring tribes or splinter groups at times, so there was a great deal of fluctuation in the composition of the alliance, with larger tribes dominating or absorbing the smaller ones. Smaller tribes belonging to the confederation included the Khoits, Zakhchin, Bayids and Khangal.

Together, these nomadic tribes roamed the grassy plains of western Inner Asia, between Lake Balkhash in present-day eastern Kazakhstan and Lake Baikal in present-day Russia north of central Mongolia. They pitched their yurts and kept herds of cattle, flocks of sheep, horses, donkeys and camels.

Paul Pelliot translated the name "Torghut" as garde de jour. He wrote that the Torghuts owed their name either to the memory of the guard of Genghis Khan or, as descendants of the Keraites, to the old garde de jour. This was documented among the Keraites in The Secret History of the Mongols before Genghis Khan took over the region (Pelliot, 1930:30).

Period of open conflict

The Four Oirat was a political entity formed by the four major Oirat tribes. During the 15–17th centuries, they established under the name "10 tumen Mongols", a cavalry unit of 10,000 horsemen, including four Oirat tumen and six tumen composed of other Mongols. They reestablished their traditional pastoral nomadic lifestyle during the end of the Yuan dynasty. The Oirats formed this alliance to defend themselves against the Khalkha Mongols and to pursue the greater objective of reunifying Mongolia.

Until the mid-17th century, when bestowal of the title of Khan was transferred to the Dalai Lama, all Mongol tribes recognized this claim and the political prestige attached to it. Although the Oirats could not assert this claim prior to the mid-17th century, they did in fact have a close connection to Genghis Khan by virtue of the fact that Genghis Khan's brother, Qasar, was in command of the Khoshut tribe.

In response to the Western Mongols' self-designation as the Four Oirat, the Eastern Mongols began to refer to themselves as the "Forty Mongols", or the "Forty and Four". This means that the Khalkha Mongols claimed to have forty tümen to the four tümen maintained by the Four Oirat.

The Oirat alliance was decentralized, informal and unstable. For instance, the Four Oirat did not have a central location from which it was governed, and it was not governed by a central figure for most of its existence. The four Oirats did not establish a single military or a unified monastic system. Lastly, it was not until 1640 that the Four Oirat adopted uniform customary laws.

As pastoralist nomads, the Oirats were organized at the tribal level, where each tribe was ruled by a noyon or prince who also functioned as the chief taishi "chieftain". The chief taishi governed with the support of lesser noyons, who were also called taishi. These minor noyons controlled divisions of the tribe (ulus) and were politically and economically independent of the chief tayishi. Chief taishis sought to influence and dominate the chief taishis of the other tribes, causing intertribal rivalry, dissension and periodic skirmishes.

Under the leadership of Esen, Chief Taishi of the Choros, the Four Oirat unified Mongolia for a short period. After Esen's death in 1455, the political union of the Dörben Oirat dissolved quickly, resulting in two decades of Oirat-Eastern Mongol conflict. The deadlock ended during the reign of Batmunkh Dayan Khan, a five-year-old boy in whose name the loyal Eastern Mongol forces rallied. Mandukhai Khatun and Dayan Khan took advantage of Oirat disunity and weakness and brought Oirats back under Mongolian rule. In doing so, he regained control of the Mongol homeland and restored the hegemony of the Eastern Mongols.

After the death of Dayan in 1543, the Oirats and the Khalkhas resumed their conflict. The Oirat forces thrust eastward, but Dayan's youngest son, Geresenz, was given command of the Khalkha forces and drove the Oirats to Uvs Lake in northwest Mongolia. In 1552, after the Oirats once again challenged the Khalkha, Altan Khan swept up from Inner Mongolia with Tümed and Ordos cavalry units, pushing elements of various Oirat tribes from Karakorum to the Khovd region in northwest Mongolia, reuniting most of Mongolia in the process (Grousset, 1970:510).

The Oirats would later regroup south of the Altai Mountains in Dzungaria. But Geresenz's grandson, Sholoi Ubashi Khuntaiji, pushed the Oirats further northwest, along the steppes of the Ob and Irtysh Rivers. Afterwards, he established a Khalkha Khanate under the name, Altan Khan, in the Oirat heartland of Dzungaria.

In spite of the setbacks, the Oirats would continue their campaigns against the Altan Khanate, trying to unseat Sholoi Ubashi Khuntaiji from Dzungaria. The continuous, back-and-forth nature of the struggle, which defined this period, is captured in the Oirat epic song "The Rout of Mongolian Sholoi Ubashi Khuntaiji", recounting the Oirat victory over the Altan Khan of the Khalkha in 1587.

Resurgence of Oirat power

At the beginning of the 17th century, the First Altan Khan drove the Oirats westward to present-day eastern Kazakhstan. The Torghuts became the westernmost Oirat tribe, encamped in the Tarbagatai Mountains region and along the northern stretches of the Irtysh, Ishim and Tobol Rivers.

Further west, the Kazakhs – a Turco-Mongol people – prevented the Torghuts from sending its trading caravans to the Muslim towns and villages located along the Syr Darya river. As a result, the Torghuts established a trading relationship with the newly established outposts of the Tsarist government whose expansion into and exploration of Siberia was motivated mostly by the desire to profit from trade with Asia.

The Khoshut, by contrast, were the easternmost Oirat, encamped near the Lake Zaysan area and the Semey region along the lower portions of the Irtysh River, where they built several steppe monasteries. The Khoshut were adjacent to the Khalkha khanates of Altan Khan and Dzasagtu Khan. Both khanates prevented the Khoshut and the other Oirat from trading with Chinese border towns. The Khoshut were ruled by Baibagas Khan and then Güshi Khan, who were the first Oirat leaders to convert to the Gelug school of Tibetan Buddhism.

Locked in between both tribes were the Choros, Dörbet Oirat and Khoid, collectively known as the "Dzungar people", who were slowly rebuilding the base of power they enjoyed under the Four Oirat. The Choros were the dominant Oirat tribe of that era. Their leader,  Erdeni Batur, attempted to follow Esen Khan in unifying the Oirats to challenge the Khalkha.

Under the dynamic leadership of Erdeni Batur, the Dzungars stopped the expansion of the first Altan Khan and began planning the resurrection of the Four Oirat under the Dzungar banner. In furtherance of such plans, Erdeni Batur designed and built a capital city called Kubak-sari on the Emil River near the modern city of Tacheng. During his attempt to build a nation, Erdeni Batur encouraged diplomacy, commerce and farming. He also sought to acquire modern weaponry and build small industry, such as metal works, to supply his military.weapons.

The attempted unification of the Oirat caused dissension among the tribes and their Chief Tayishis who were independent minded but also highly regarded leaders themselves. This dissension reputedly caused Kho Orluk to move the Torghut tribe and elements of the Dörbet tribe westward to the Volga region where his descendants formed the Kalmyk Khanate. In the east, Güshi Khan took part of the Khoshut to the Tsaidam and Qinghai regions in the Tibetan Plateau, where he formed the Khoshut Khanate to protect Tibet and the Gelug from both internal and external enemies. Erdeni Batur and his descendants, by contrast, formed the Dzungar Khanate and came to dominate Central Eurasia.

Torghut migration
In 1618, the Torghut and a small contingent of Dörbet Oirats (200,000–250,000 people) chose to migrate from the upper Irtysh River region to the grazing pastures of the lower Volga region south of Saratov and north of the Caspian Sea on both banks of the Volga River. The Torghut were led by their taishi, Kho Orluk. They were the largest Oirat tribe to migrate, bringing along nearly the entire tribe. The second-largest group was the Dörbet Oirats under their taishi, Dalai Batur. Together they moved west through southern Siberia and the southern Ural Mountains, avoiding the more direct route that would have taken them through the heart of the territory of their enemy, the Kazakhs. En route, they raided Russian settlements and Kazakh and Bashkir encampments.

Many theories have been advanced to explain the reasons for the migration. One generally accepted theory is that there may have been discontent among the Oirat tribes, which arose from the attempt by Kharkhul, taishi of the Dzungars, to centralize political and military control over the tribes under his leadership. Some scholars, however, believe that the Torghuts sought uncontested pastures as their territory was being encroached upon by the Russians from the north, the Kazakhs from the south and the Dzungars from the east. The encroachments resulted in overcrowding of people and livestock, thereby diminishing the food supply. Lastly, a third theory suggests that the Torghuts grew weary of the militant struggle between the Oirats and the Altan Khanate.

Kalmyk Khanate

Period of self rule, 1630–1724

Upon arrival to the lower Volga region in 1630, the Oirats encamped on land that was once part of the Astrakhan Khanate, but was now claimed by the Tsardom of Russia. The region was lightly populated, from south of Saratov to the Russian garrison at Astrakhan and on both the east and the west banks of the Volga River. The Tsardom of Russia was not ready to colonize the area and was in no position to prevent the Oirats from encamping in the region, but it had a direct political interest in ensuring that the Oirats would not become allied with its Turkic-speaking neighbors. The Kalmyks became Russian allies and a treaty to protect the southern Russian border was signed between the Kalmyk Khanate and Russia.

The Oirats quickly consolidated their position by expelling the majority of the native inhabitants, the Nogai Horde. Large groups of Nogais fled southeast to the northern Caucasian plain and west to the Black Sea steppe, lands claimed by the Crimean Khanate, itself a vassal or ally of the Ottoman Empire. Smaller groups of Nogais sought the protection of the Russian garrison at Astrakhan. The remaining nomadic tribes became vassals of the Oirats.

The Kalmyks battled the Karakalpaks. The Mangyshlak Peninsula was overtaken in 1639 by Kalmyks.

At first, an uneasy relationship existed between the Russians and the Oirats. Mutual raiding by the Oirats of Russian settlements and by the Cossacks and the Bashkirs, Muslim vassals of the Russians, of Oirat encampments was commonplace. Numerous oaths and treaties were signed to ensure Oirat loyalty and military assistance. Although the Oirats became subjects of the Tsar, such allegiance by the Oirats was deemed to be nominal.

In reality, the Oirats governed themselves pursuant to a document known as the "Great Code of the Nomads" (Iki Tsaadzhin Bichig). The Code was promulgated in 1640 by them, their brethren in Dzungaria and some of the Khalkha who all gathered near the Tarbagatai Mountains in Dzungaria to resolve their differences and to unite under the banner of the Gelug school. Although the goal of unification was not met, the summit leaders did ratify the Code, which regulated all aspects of nomadic life.

In securing their position, the Oirats became a borderland power, often allying themselves with the Russian Empire against the neighboring Muslim population. During the era of Ayuka Khan, the Oirats rose to political and military prominence as the Russian Empire sought the increased use of Oirat cavalry in support of its military campaigns against the Muslim powers in the south, such as Safavid Iran, the Ottoman Empire, the Nogais, the Tatars of Kuban and the Crimean Khanate. Ayuka Khan also waged wars against the Kazakhs, subjugated the Turkmens of the Mangyshlak Peninsula, and made multiple expeditions against the highlanders of the North Caucasus. These campaigns highlighted the strategic importance of the Kalmyk Khanate which functioned as a buffer zone, separating Russia and the Muslim world, as Russia fought wars in Europe to establish itself as a European power.

To encourage the release of Oirat cavalrymen in support of its military campaigns, the Russian Empire increasingly relied on the provision of monetary payments and dry goods to the Oirat Khan and the Oirat nobility. In that respect, the Russian Empire treated the Oirats as it did the Cossacks. The provision of monetary payments and dry goods, however, did not stop the mutual raiding, and, in some instances, both sides failed to fulfill its promises (Halkovic, 1985:41–54).

Another significant incentive the Russian Empire provided to the Oirats was tariff-free access to the markets of Russian border towns, where the Oirats were permitted to barter their herds and the items they obtained from Asia and their Muslim neighbors in exchange for Russian goods. Trade also occurred with neighboring Turkic tribes under Russian control, such as the Tatars and the Bashkirs. Intermarriage became common with such tribes. This trading arrangement provided substantial benefits, monetary and otherwise, to the Oirat tayishis, noyons and zaisangs.

Fred Adelman described this era as the "Frontier Period", lasting from the advent of the Torghut under Kho Orluk in 1630 to the end of the great khanate of Kho Orluk's descendant, Ayuka Khan, in 1724, a phase accompanied by little discernible acculturative change:

During the era of Ayuka Khan, the Kalmyk Khanate reached its peak of military and political power. The Khanate experienced economic prosperity from free trade with Russian border towns, China, Tibet and with their Muslim neighbors. During this era, Ayuka Khan also kept close contacts with his Oirat kinsmen in Dzungaria, as well as the Dalai Lama in Tibet.

From Oirat to Kalmyk

Historically, Oirat identified themselves by their respective sub-group names. In the 15th century, the three major groups of Oirat formed an alliance, adopting "Dörben Oirat" as their collective name. In the early 17th century, a second great Oirat Confederation emerged, which later became the Dzungar Empire. While the Dzungars (initially Choros, Dörbet and Khoit tribes) were establishing their empire in Central Eurasia, the Khoshuts were establishing the Khoshut Khanate in Tibet, protecting the Gelugpa sect from its enemies, and the Torghuts formed the Kalmyk Khanate in the lower Volga region.

After encamping, the Oirats began to identify themselves as "Kalmyk." This named was supposedly given to them by their Muslim neighbors and later used by the Russians to describe them. The Oirats used this name in their dealings with outsiders, viz., their Russian and Muslim neighbors. But, they continued to refer to themselves by their tribal, clan, or other internal affiliations.

The name Kalmyk, however, wasn't immediately accepted by all of the Oirat tribes in the lower Volga region. As late as 1761, the Khoshut and Dzungars (refugees from the Manchu Empire) referred to themselves and the Torghuts exclusively as Oirats. The Torghuts, by contrast, used the name Kalmyk for themselves as well as the Khoshut and Dzungars. (Khodarkovsky, 1992:8)

Generally, European scholars have identified all western Mongolians collectively as Kalmyks, regardless of their location (Ramstedt, 1935: v–vi). Such scholars (e.g. Sebastian Muenster) have relied on Muslim sources who traditionally used the word "Kalmyk" to describe western Mongolians in a derogatory manner and the western Mongols of China and Mongolia have regarded that name as a term of abuse (Haslund, 1935:214–215). Instead, they use the name Oirat or they go by their respective tribal names, e.g., Khoshut, Dörbet, Choros, Torghut, Khoit, Bayid, Mingat, etc. (Anuchin, 1914:57).

Over time, the descendants of the Oirat migrants in the lower Volga region embraced the name "Kalmyk" irrespective of their locations, viz., Astrakhan, the Don Cossack region, Orenburg, Stavropol, the Terek and the Ural Mountains. Another generally accepted name is Ulan Zalata or the "red-buttoned ones" (Adelman, 1960:6).

Reduction in autonomy, 1724–1771

By the early 18th century, there were approximately 300–350,000 Kalmyks and 15,000,000 Russians. After the death of Ayuka Khan in 1724, the political situation among the Kalmyks became unstable as various factions sought to be recognized as Khan. The Russian Empire also gradually chipped away at the autonomy of the Kalmyk Khanate. These policies, for instance, encouraged the establishment of Russian and German settlements on pastures the Kalmyks used to roam and feed their livestock. In addition, the Tsarist government imposed a council on the Kalmyk Khan, thereby diluting his authority, while continuing to expect the Kalmyk Khan to provide cavalry units to fight on behalf of Russia. The Russian Orthodox Church, by contrast, pressured many Kalmyks to adopt Eastern Orthodoxy. By the mid-18th century, Kalmyks were increasingly disillusioned with settler encroachment and interference in its internal affairs.

In January 1771 the oppression of Tsarist administration forced the larger part of Kalmyks (33 thousand households, or approximately 170,000–200,000 people) to migrate to Dzungaria.

Ubashi Khan, the great-grandson of Ayuka Khan and the last Kalmyk Khan, decided to return his people to their ancestral homeland, Dzungaria, and restore the Dzungar Khanate and Mongolian independence. As C.D Barkman notes, "It is quite clear that the Torghuts had not intended to surrender the Chinese, but had hoped to lead an independent existence in Dzungaria."

Ubashi sent 30,000 cavalry in the first year of the Russo-Turkish War (1768–74) to gain weaponry before the migration. The 8th Dalai Lama was contacted to request his blessing and to set the date of departure. After consulting the astrological chart, he set a return date, but at the moment of departure, the weakening of the ice on the Volga River permitted only those Kalmyks (about 200,000 people) on the eastern bank to leave. Those 100,000–150,000 people on the western bank were forced to stay behind and Catherine the Great executed influential nobles from among them.

Approximately five-sixths of the Torghut followed Ubashi Khan. Most of the Khoshut, Choros, and Khoid also accompanied the Torghut on their journey to Dzungaria. The Dörbet Oirat, in contrast, elected not to go at all.

Catherine the Great asked the Russian army, Bashkirs, and Kazakh Khanate to stop all migrants. Beset by Kazakh raids, thirst and starvation, approximately 85,000 Kalmyks died on their way to Dzungaria. After failing to stop the flight, Catherine abolished the Kalmyk Khanate, transferring all governmental powers to the governor of Astrakhan. The title of Khan was abolished. The highest native governing office remaining was the Vice-Khan, who also was recognized by the government as the highest ranking Kalmyk prince. By appointing the Vice-Khan, the Russian Empire was now permanently the decisive force in Kalmyk government and affairs.

After seven months of travel, only one-third (66,073) of the original group reached Balkhash Lake, the western border of Qing China. This migration became the topic of The Revolt of the Tartars, by Thomas De Quincey.

The Qing shifted the Kalmyks to five different areas to prevent their revolt and influential leaders of the Kalmyks soon died. The migrant Kalmyks became known as Torghut in Qing China. The Torghut were coerced by the Qing into giving up their nomadic lifestyle and to take up sedentary agriculture instead as part of a deliberate policy by the Qing to enfeeble them.

Life in the Russian Empire
After the 1771 exodus, the Kalmyks that remained part of the Russian Empire continued their nomadic pastoral lifestyle, ranging the pastures between the Don and the Volga Rivers, wintering in the lowlands along the shores of the Caspian Sea as far as Sarpa Lake to the northwest and Lake Manych-Gudilo to the west. In the spring, they moved along the Don River and the Sarpa lake system, attaining the higher grounds along the Don in the summer, passing the autumn in the Sarpa and Volga lowlands. In October and November they returned to their winter camps and pastures (Krader, 1963:121 citing Pallas, vol. 1, 1776:122–123).

Despite their great loss in population, the Torghut still remained numerically superior, dominating the Kalmyks. The other Kalmyks in Russia included Dörbet Oirats and Khoshut. Elements of the Choros and Khoit also were present but were too few in number to retain their ulus (tribal division) as independent administrative units. As a result, they were absorbed by the ulus of the larger tribes.

The factors that caused the 1771 exodus continued to trouble the remaining Kalmyks. In the wake of the exodus, the Torghuts joined the Cossack rebellion of Yemelyan Pugachev in hopes that he would restore the independence of the Kalmyks. After Pugachev's Rebellion was defeated, Catherine the Great transferred the office of the Vice-Khan from the Torghut tribe to the Dörbet, whose princes supposedly remained loyal to the government during the rebellion. Thus the Torghut were removed from their role as the hereditary leaders of the Kalmyk people. The Khoshut could not challenge this political arrangement due to their smaller population size.

The disruptions to Kalmyk society caused by the exodus and the Torghut participation in the Pugachev Rebellion precipitated a major realignment in Kalmyk tribal structure. The government divided the Kalmyks into three administrative units attached, according to their respective locations, to the district governments of Astrakhan, Stavropol and the Don and appointed a special Russian official bearing the title of "Guardian of the Kalmyk People" for purposes of administration. The government also resettled some small groups of Kalmyks along the Ural, Terek and Kuma rivers and in Siberia.

The redistricting divided the now dominant Dörbet tribe into three separate administrative units. Those in the western Kalmyk Steppe were attached to the Astrakhan district government. They were called Baga (Lesser) Dörbet. By contrast, the Dörbets who moved to the northern part of the Stavropol province were called Ike (Greater) Dörbet even though their population was smaller. Finally, the Kalmyks of the Don became known as Buzava. Although they were composed of elements of all the Kalmyk tribes, the Buzava claimed descent from the Torghut tribe. Their name is derived from two tributaries of the Don River: Busgai and Busuluk. In 1798, Tsar Paul I recognized the Don Kalmyks as Don Cossacks. As such, they received the same rights and benefits as their Russian counterparts in exchange for providing national military services (Bajanowa, 1976:68–71). At the end of the Napoleonic Wars, Kalmyk cavalry units in Russian service entered Paris.

Over time, the Kalmyks gradually created fixed settlements with houses and temples, in place of transportable round felt yurts. In 1865, Elista, the future capital of the Kalmyk Autonomous Soviet Socialist Republic was founded. This process lasted until well after the October Revolution of 1917.

Russian Revolution and Civil War

Like most people in Russia, the Kalmyks greeted the February Revolution with enthusiasm. Kalmyk leaders believed that the Russian Provisional Government, which replaced the Tsarist government, would allow greater autonomy and freedom with respect to their culture, religion and economy. This enthusiasm, however, would soon dissolve after the Bolsheviks took control of the national government during the second revolution in November 1917.

After the Bolsheviks took control, various political and ethnic groups opposed to Communism organized in a loose political and military coalition known as the White movement. A volunteer "White Army" was raised to fight the Red Army, the military arm of the Bolshevik government. Initially, this army was composed primarily of volunteers and Tsarist supporters but were later joined by the Cossacks, including Don Kalmyks, many of whom resisted the Bolshevik policy of decossackization.

The second revolution split the Kalmyk people into opposing camps. Many were dissatisfied with the Tsarist government for its historic role in promoting the colonization of the Kalmyk steppe and in encouraging the russification of the Kalmyk people. But others also felt hostility towards Bolshevism for two reasons: (1) the loyalty of the Kalmyk people to their traditional leaders (i.e., nobility and clergy) – sources of anti-Communism – was deeply ingrained; and (2) the Bolshevik exploitation of the conflict between the Kalmyks and the local Russian peasants who seized Kalmyk land and livestock (Loewenthal, 1952:4).

The Astrakhan Kalmyk nobility, led by Prince Danzan Tundutov of the Baga Dörbets and Prince Sereb-Djab Tiumen of the Khoshuts, expressed their anti-Bolshevik sentiments by seeking to integrate the Astrakhan Kalmyks into the military units of the Astrakhan Cossacks. But before a general mobilization of Kalmyk horsemen could occur, the Red Army seized power in Astrakhan and in the Kalmyk steppe thereby preventing the mobilization from occurring.

After the capture of Astrakhan, the Bolsheviks engaged in savage reprisals against the Kalmyk people, especially against Buddhist temples and the Buddhist clergy (Arbakov, 1958:30–36). Eventually the Bolsheviks would draft as many as 18,000 Kalmyk horsemen in the Red Army to prevent them from joining the White Army (Borisov, 1926:84). This objective, however, failed to prevent many Red Army Kalmyk horsemen from defecting to the White side.

The majority of the Don Kalmyks also sided with the White Movement to preserve their Cossack lifestyle and proud traditions. As Don Cossacks, the Don Kalmyks first fought under White army General Anton Denikin and then under his successor, General Pyotr Nikolayevich Wrangel. Because the Don Cossack Host to which they belonged was the main center of the White Movement and of Cossack resistance, the battles were fought on Cossack lands and were disastrous for the Don Cossacks as villages and entire regions changed hands repeatedly in a fratricidal conflict in which both sides committed terrible atrocities. The Don Cossacks, including the Don Kalmyks, experienced heavy military and civilian losses, either from the fighting itself or from starvation and disease induced by the war. Some argue that the Bolsheviks were guilty of the mass extermination of the Don Cossack people, killing an estimated 70 percent (or 700,000 persons) of the Don Cossack population (Heller and Nekrich, 1988:87).

By October 1920 the Red Army smashed General Wrangel's resistance in the Crimea, forcing the evacuation of some 150,000 White army soldiers and their families to Constantinople, Turkey. A small group of Don Kalmyks managed to escape on the British and French vessels. The chaos at the Russian port city of Novorossiysk was described by Major H.N.H. Williamson of the British Military Mission to the Don Cossacks as follows:

From there, this group resettled in Europe, primarily in Belgrade (where they established the fourth Buddhist temple in Europe), Bulgaria, Czechoslovakia and France where its leaders remained active in the White movement. In 1922, several hundred Don Kalmyks returned home under a general amnesty. Some returnees, including Prince Dmitri Tundutov, were imprisoned and then executed soon after their return.

Formation of the Kalmyk Soviet Republic 
The Soviet government established the Kalmyk Autonomous Oblast in November 1920. It was formed by merging the Stavropol Kalmyk settlements with a majority of the Astrakhan Kalmyks. A small number of Don Kalmyks (Buzava) from the Don Host migrated to this Oblast. The administrative center was Elista, a small village in the western part of the Oblast that was expanded in the 1920s to reflect its status as the capital of the Oblast.

In October 1935, the Kalmyk Autonomous Oblast was reorganized into the Kalmyk Autonomous Soviet Socialist Republic. The chief occupations of the Republic were cattle breeding, agriculture, including the growing of cotton and fishing. There was no industry.

Collectivization and revolts 
On 22 January 1922 Mongolia proposed to migrate the Kalmyks during famine in Kalmykia but Russia refused. 71–72,000 Kalmyks died during the famine. The Kalmyks revolted against Russia in 1926, 1930 and 1942–1943. In March 1927, Soviet deported 20,000 Kalmyks to Siberia, tundra and Karelia.  Soviet scientists attempted to convince the Kalmyks and Buryats that they were not Mongols during the 20th century under the demongolization policy.

In 1929, Joseph Stalin ordered the forced collectivization of agriculture, forcing the Astrakhan Kalmyks to abandon their traditional nomadic pastoralist lifestyle and to settle in villages. All Kalmyk herdsmen owning more than 500 sheep were deported to labor camps in Siberia.

World War II and exile

In June 1941 the German army invaded the Soviet Union, ultimately taking (some) control of the Kalmyk Autonomous Soviet Socialist Republic. In December 1942, however, the Red Army in their turn re-invaded the Republic. On 28 December 1943, the Soviet government accused the Kalmyks of collaborating with the Germans and deported the entire population, including Kalmyk Red Army soldiers, to various locations in Central Asia and Siberia. Within 24 hours the population transfer occurred at night during winter without notice in unheated cattle cars.

According to N. F. Bugai, the leading Russian expert on deportations, 4.9% of the Kalmyk population died during the first three months of 1944; 1.5% in the first three months of 1945; and 0.7% in the same period of 1946. From 1945 to 1950, 15,206 Kalmyks died and 7843 were born.

The Kalmyk Autonomous Soviet Socialist Republic was quickly dissolved. Its territory was divided and transferred to the adjacent regions, viz., the Astrakhan and Stalingrad Oblasts and Stavropol Krai. Since no Kalmyks lived there any longer the Soviet authorities changed the names of towns and villages from Kalmyk names to Russian names. For example, Elista became Stepnoi.

Return from Siberian exile

Around half of (97–98,000) Kalmyk people deported to Siberia died before being allowed to return home in 1957. The government of the Soviet Union forbade teaching Kalmyk Oirat during the deportation. The Kalmyks' main purpose was to migrate to Mongolia. Under the Law of the Russian Federation of April 26, 1991, "On Rehabilitation of Exiled Peoples", repressions against Kalmyks and other peoples were qualified as an act of genocide.

In 1957, Soviet Premier Nikita Khrushchev permitted the Kalmyk people to return to their home. Upon return, however, the Kalmyks found their homeland had become settled by Russians and Ukrainians, many of whom chose to remain. On January 9, 1957, Kalmykia once again became an autonomous oblast, and on 29 July 1958, an autonomous republic within the Russian Soviet Federative Socialist Republic.

In the following years bad planning of agricultural and irrigation projects resulted in widespread desertification. In addition, industrial plants were constructed without an analysis of the economic viability of such plants.

In 1992, after the dissolution of the Soviet Union, Kalmykia chose to remain an autonomous republic of the successor government, the Russian Federation. The dissolution, however, facilitated the collapse of the economy at both the national and the local level, causing widespread economic and social hardship. The resulting upheaval caused many young Kalmyks to leave Kalmykia, especially in the rural areas, for economic opportunities in and outside the Russian Federation.

The local Supreme Soviet decided in 1992 to change the name of the republic to Khalmg Tangch. The Kalmyk authorities claimed that under the terms of the 1991 law On the Rehabilitation of Repressed Peoples, the lands, currently in the Astrakhan Oblast and Dagestan, would formally belong to Kalmykia with effect from July 1, 1993. The long-standing dispute over the delineation of Kalmykia's borders with Astrakhan oblast and Dagestan resurfaced in 2005, but no border changes were made.

The Kalmyks' ability to maintain a mostly homogeneous existence contrasts with the Russian admixture with other similar people, "as there is evidence for Russian admixture with Yakuts," for example. Thus far, genetic analysis of the Kalmyks supports their Mongol roots that also shows that entire families of Kalmyks moved to the Volga region and not simply males as is generally the case with most nomadic tribal groups.

In modern times, Kalmykia has friendly diplomatic and cultural ties with Mongolia.

Etymology 

Mongolians name Kalmyks as Halimag. It means "the people moving away". The verb "Halih" in Mongolian means leakage, seepage or overpour. So the name "Halimag" is given, because they were the people who leaked from Mongolians and Mongolian land.

The name "Kalmyk" is a word of Turkic origin that means "remnant" or "to remain". Turkic tribes may have used this name as early as the thirteenth century. Arab geographer Ibn al-Wardi is documented as the first person to use the term in referring to the Oirats in the fourteenth century (Khodarkovsky, 1992:5, citing Bretschneider, 1910:2:167). The khojas of Kashgaria applied the name to Oirats in the fifteenth century  (Grousset, 1970:506). Russian written sources mentioned the name "Kolmak Tatars" as early as 1530, and cartographer Sebastian Muenster (1488–1552) circumscribed the territory of the "Kalmuchi" on a map in his Cosmographia, which was published in 1544. The Oirats themselves, however, did not accept the name as their own.

Subgroups
There are these main ethnic subgroups of Kalmyks: Baatud, Dörbet, Khoid, Khoshut, Olot, Torghut and Buzava. The Torghuts and Dörbets are numerically dominant. The Buzavs are a small minority and are considered to be the most russified Kalmyks.

Demographics

This statistics is about the demographics of the Kalmyks in the Russian Empire, Soviet Union and Russian Federation.

Location 

The Kalmyks live primarily in the Republic of Kalmykia, a federal subject of Russia. Kalmykia is located in the southeast European part of Russia, between the Volga and the Don rivers. It has borders with the Republic of Dagestan in the south; the Stavropol Krai in the southwest; and the Rostov Oblast and the Volgograd Oblast in the west and the northwest, respectively. Its eastern border is the Astrakhan Oblast. The southeast border is the Caspian Sea.

After the collapse of the Soviet Union, a large number of Kalmyks, primarily the young, moved from Kalmykia to larger cities in Russia, such as Moscow and St. Petersburg, and to the United States. The move was precipitated by the desire of these Kalmyks to pursue better educational and economic opportunities and continues today.

Currently, Kalmyks form a majority of the population in Kalmykia. According to the 2021 Russian census, there was a total of 159,138 Kalmyks who resided within Kalmykia. This represented 62.5% of the total population of the republic in 2021. In addition, Kalmyks have a much higher fertility rate than Russians and the other Slavic peoples, while the median age of the Kalmyk population is much lower than Russians. This ensures that the Kalmyk population will continue to grow for the foreseeable future.

Religion 

The Kalmyks are the only inhabitants of Europe whose national religion is Buddhism. They embraced Buddhism in the early part of the 17th century and belong to the Tibetan Buddhist sect known as the Gelugpa (Virtuous Way). The Gelugpa are commonly referred to as the Yellow Hat sect. The religion is derived from the Indian Mahayana form of Buddhism. In the West, it was formerly referred to as Lamaism, from the name of the Tibetan monks, the lamas.

Historically, Kalmyk clergy received their training either on the steppe or in Tibet. The pupils who received their religious training on the steppe joined Kalmyk monasteries, which were active centers of learning. Many of these monasteries operated out of felt tents, which accompanied the Kalmyk tribes as they migrated. The Oirats maintained tent monasteries throughout present-day eastern Kazakhstan and along the migratory route they took across southern Siberia to the Volga. They also maintained tent monasteries around Lake Issyk Kul in present-day Kyrgyzstan.

The Oirats also built stone monasteries in the regions of eastern Kazakhstan. For instance, the remains of stone Buddhist monasteries have been found at Almalik and at Kyzyl-Kent (See image to the right). In addition, there was a great Buddhist monastery in Semipalatinsk (seven palaces), which derives its name from that seven-halled Buddhist temple. Further, remains of Buddhist monasteries have been found at Ablaiket near Ust Kamenogorsk and at Talgar, near Almaty, and at Sumbe in the Narynkol region, bordering China.

Upon completion of training, Kalmyk clergy dispensed not only spiritual guidance but also medical advice. As clergymen, the Kalmyk lamas enjoyed great political influence among the nobility and held a strong influence over the general tribal population. For many commoners, the only path to literacy and prestige was to join the Kalmyk monastic system.

As a matter of policy, the Tsarist government and the Russian Orthodox Church sought to gradually absorb and convert any subject of another creed or nationality. The aim of the policy was to eliminate foreign influence and to entrench newly annexed areas. The baptized indigenous population would then become loyal to the Russian empire and would agree to be governed by Russian officials.

In the 1700s some Kalmyks converted to Roman Catholicism, however their numbers were insignificant compared to Kalmyk converts to Islam who were more numerous. One group of Kalmyk Muslims were known as the Tomuts who were formed as the offspring of mixed marriages between Kalmyk women and Kazakh and Bashkir communities who lived among the Kalmyks and by the end of the 1730s they numbered around 600 tents. Another group of Kalmyk Muslims was known as the Sherets, they consisted of 120 tents and in 1733 they fled from the Derbet tayishi Cheter and settled near Azov. Later they were transferred to Crimea where they converted to Islam. In 1744, 233 Kalmyk men and 413 Kalmyk women were converted to Islam by the Astrakhan Tatars. Today, Sart Kalmyks living in Kyrgyzstan are predominantly Sunni Muslims.

A small percentage of Kalmyk-Cossack families in Belarus converted to Judaism in the early 19th century.

The Kalmyks migrated to territory annexed by the Tsarist government and were subject to this policy as long as they remained in this territory. At first, the policies contributed to the conversion of the Kalmyk nobility. One of the earliest converts were the children of Donduk-Ombo, the sixth Khan of the Kalmyks who reigned between 1737 and 1741, and his Circassian-born wife (See Dondukov family). Another important convert was Baksaday-Dorji, the grandson of Ayuka Khan who adopted the Christian name, Peter Taishin. Each conversion was motivated by political ambition to become the Kalmyk Khan. Kalmyk Tayishis, by contrast, were given salaries and towns and settlements were established for them and their ulus (Khodarkovsky, 1992:39).

Later on, the Tsarist government policy of encouraging Russian and German settlements along the Volga indirectly pressured Kalmyks to convert for economic reasons. The settlers took the most fertile land along the river, leaving barren lands for the Kalmyks to graze their herds. The resulting reduction of herds led to impoverishment for Kalmyk Tayishis, some of whom led their ulus to Christianity to obtain economic benefits.

To discourage the monastic lifestyle, the government required the building of permanent structures at government determined construction sites while imposing Russian architects (Pozdneev, 1914). This policy resulted in the suspension of Lamaist canonical regulations governing monastery construction and in Kalmyk temples resembling Russian Orthodox churches. For example, the Khoshutovsky Khurul is modeled after the Kazan Cathedral in St. Petersburg, Russia.

Other policies the Tsarist government implemented sought to gradually weaken the influence of the lamas. For instance, the government limited Kalmyk contact with Tibet. In addition, the Tsar began appointing the Šajin Lama (title of the High Lama of the Kalmyks). Further, the economic crises that resulted from settler encroachment forced many monasteries and temples to close and lamas to adopt a secularized lifestyle. The success of this policy is borne out by the decrease in the number of Kalmyk monasteries in the Volga region during the 19th century (Loewenthal, 1952 citing Riasanovsky, 1929).

{| class="wikitable"
|+Number of Kalmyk monasteries in the Volga region
|-
! Year || Number
|-
| early 19th century
| style="text-align:center;"|200
|-
| 1834
| style="text-align:center;"|76
|-
| 1847
| style="text-align:center;"|67
|-
| before 1895
| style="text-align:center;"|62
|-
| before 1923
| style="text-align:center;"|60+
|}

Like the Tsarist government, the Communist regime was aware of the influence the Kalmyk clergy held over the general population. In the 1920s and the 1930s, the Soviet government implemented policies to eliminate religion through control and suppression. Towards that end, Kalmyk khuruls (temples) and monasteries were destroyed and property confiscated; the clergy and many believers were harassed, killed, or sent to labor camps; religious artifacts and books were destroyed; and young men were prohibited from religious training.

In the 1920s and 1930s Buddhist temples and monasteries were destroyed and almost all of the spiritual leaders were arrested. By 1940 all Kalmyk Buddhist temples were either closed or destroyed and the clergy systematically oppressed. Dr. Loewenthal writes that the policies were so enforced that the Kalmyk clergy and Buddhism were not mentioned in the work by B. Dzhimbinov, "Sovetskaya Kalmykiya," published in 1940. In 1944, the Soviet government exiled all Kalmyks not fighting in the Soviet army to Central Asia and Siberia, accusing them of collaborating with Nazi Germany. Upon rehabilitation in 1957, the Kalmyks were permitted to return home from exile, but all attempts by them to restore their religion and to build a temple failed.

By the 1980s, the Soviet campaign against religion was so successful that a majority of the Kalmyks had never received any formal spiritual guidance. By the late 1980s, however, the Soviet government reversed course and implemented policies favoring the liberalization of religion. As a result, the first Buddhist community was organized in 1988. By 1995, there were 21 Buddhist temples, 17 places of worship for various Christian denominations, and 1 mosque in the Republic of Kalmykia (Grin, 2000:7).

On December 27, 2005, a new khurul opened in Elista, the capital of the Republic of Kalmykia. The khurul was named "Burkhan Bakshin Altan Sume". It is the largest Buddhist temple in Europe. The government of the Republic of Kalmykia sought to build a magnificent temple of a monumental scale in hopes of creating an international learning center for Buddhist scholars and students from all over the world. More significantly, the temple is a monument to the Kalmyk people who died in exile between 1944 and 1957.

The Kalmyks of Kyrgyzstan live primarily in the Karakol region of eastern Kyrgyzstan. They are referred to as "Sart Kalmyks." The origin of this name is unknown. Likewise, it is not known when, why and from where this small group of Kalmyks migrated to eastern Kyrgyzstan. Due to their minority status, the Sart Kalmyks have adopted the Turkic language and culture of the majority Kyrgyz population. As a result, nearly all now belong to the Muslim faith.

Although Sart Kalmyks are Muslims, Kalmyks elsewhere by and large remain faithful to the Gelugpa Order of Tibetan Buddhism. In Kalmykia, for example, the Gelugpa Order with the assistance of the government has constructed numerous Buddhist temples. In addition, the Kalmyk people recognize Tenzin Gyatso, 14th Dalai Lama as their spiritual leader and Erdne Ombadykow, a Kalmyk American, as the supreme lama of the Kalmyk people. The Dalai Lama has visited Elista on a number of occasions. Buddhism and Christianity have been given the status of state religions. In November 2004 the 14th Dalai Lama visited Kalmykia.

Language 

Ethnologue classifies Kalmyk Oirat as a member of the Eastern branch of the Mongolic languages: "Mongolic, Eastern, Oirat-Khalkha, Oirat-Kalmyk-Darkhat". This places Standard Mongolian – which is essentially Khalkha Mongolian – and Kalmyk Oirat fairly close together.

Other linguists, such as Nicholas Poppe, have classified Kalmyk Oirat as belonging to the Western branch of the Mongolian language division and thus more distant from Khalkha and Standard Mongolian as spoken in modern Mongolia, since the language group developed separately and is distinct. Moreover, Poppe contends that, although there is little phonetic and morphological difference, Kalmyk and Oirat are two distinct languages. The major distinction is in their lexicons. The Kalmyk language, for example, has adopted many words of Russian origin. Consequently, mainly on lexical grounds, Kalmyk is classified as a distinct language (Poppe 1970).

By population, the major dialects of Kalmyk are Torghut, Dörbet and Buzava (Bormanshinov 1990). Minor dialects include Khoshut and Olöt. The Kalmyk dialects vary somewhat, but the differences are insignificant. Generally, the Russian language less influenced the dialects of the pastoral nomadic Kalmyk tribes of the Volga region.

The Buzava dialect developed from their close interaction with Russians. In 1798 the Tsarist government recognized the Buzava as Don Cossacks, both militarily and administratively. As a result of their integration into the Don Host, the Buzava dialect incorporated many words of Russian origin. (Anon. 1914: 653–660)

In 1938 the Kalmyk literary language started using Cyrillic script.
During World War II, all Kalmyks not fighting in the Soviet Army were forcibly exiled to Siberia and Central Asia, where they were dispersed and not permitted to speak Kalmyk in public places. As a result, the Kalmyk language was not formally taught to the younger generation of Kalmyks.
Upon return from exile in 1957, the Kalmyks spoke and published primarily in Russian. Consequently, the younger generation of Kalmyks primarily speak Russian and not their own native language. This is a subject of popular concern. In recent years, the Kalmyk government has made attempts to revive the Kalmyk language. Some laws have been passed regarding the usage of Kalmyk on shop signs; for example, on entrance doors, the words 'Entrance' and 'Push-Pull' appear in Kalmyk.

According to UNESCO's 2010 edition of the Red Book of Endangered Languages, the Kalmyk language classified as definitely endangered.

Writing system 

In the 17th century, Zaya Pandita, a Khoshut Buddhist monk, devised a writing system, Clear Script, based on the classical vertical Mongol script in order to phonetically capture the Oirat language. In the later part of the 19th and early part of the 20th centuries, Clear Script fell into disuse until the Kalmyks abandoned it in 1923 and introduced the Cyrillic script. In 1930, Kalmyk language scholars introduced a modified Latin alphabet, but it was not used for long.

List of notable Kalmyks

Maria Kirbasova, Russian human rights activist who founded the Committee of Soldiers' Mothers of Russia

Political figures
 Kirsan Ilyumzhinov - 1st President of Kalmykia, former President of FIDE
 Vladimir Lenin (Possibly up to 1/4th Kalmyk) - Russian revolutionary, politician, and political theorist
 Ilya Ulyanov (1/2 Kalmyk)
 Oka Gorodovikov - Red Army cavalry general
 Lavr Kornilov - Imperial Russian Army general, commander of the anti-Bolshevik Volunteer Army

Khans of the Kalmyk Khanate

 Kho Orluk
 Shukhur Daichin — 1654-1661
 Puntsug (Monchak) — 1661-1669
 Ayuka Khan — 1669-1724
 Tseren Donduk Khan — 1724-1735
 Donduk Ombo Khan — 1735-1741
 Donduk Dashi Khan — 1741-1761 
 Ubashi Khan — 1761-1771

Athletes
 Sanan Sjugirov
 Batu Khasikov
 Mingiyan Semenov
 Sandje Ivanchukov
 Jean Djorkaeff (1/2 Kalmyk)
 Youri Djorkaeff (1/4 Kalmyk)
 Oan Djorkaeff (1/8 Kalmyk)
Liudmila Bodnieva

References

Bibliography 
 Adelman, Fred. Kalmyk Cultural Renewal, PhD Dissertation, University of Pennsylvania, 1960.
 Anonymous. Donskaia Oblast, Donskoi Pervyi Okrug, Donskoi Vtoroi Okrug (translation: The Don Region, First Don District, Second Don District), Novyi Entsliklopedicheskii Solvar, XVI, 1914.
 Anuchin, D. "Kalmyki", Entsiklopedicheskii Slovar Brokgauz-Efrona, XIV, St. Petersburg, 1914.
 Arbakov, Dorzha. Genocide in the USSR, Chapter II, Complete Destruction of National Groups as Groups, The Kalmyks, Nikolai Dekker and Andrei Lebed, Editors, Series I, No. 40, Institute for the Study of the USSR, Munich, 1958.
 Borisov, T.K. Kalmykiya: A historic-political and socio-economic survey, Moscow-Leningrad, 1926.
 Bormanshinov, Arash. The Kalmyks: Their Ethnic, Historical, Religious, and Cultural Background, Kalmyk American Cultural Association, Occasional Papers Number One, 1990.
 Bretschneider, E.V. Medieval Researches from Eastern Asiatic Sources, 2 vols., London: Kegan Paul, Trench, Trübner, 1910.

 Dzhimbinov, B. Sovetskaia Kalmykiia, Moscow, 1940.
 Grin, François. Kalmykia: From Oblivion to Assertion, European Center or Minority Issues, ECMI Working Paper #10, 2000.
 Grousset, René. The Empire of the Steppes: A History of Central Asia, Rutgers University Press, 1970.
 Halkovic, Jr., Stephen A. THE MONGOLS OF THE WEST, Indiana University Uralic and Altaic Series, Volume 148, Larry Moses, Editor, Research Institute for Inner Asian Studies, Indiana University, Bloomington, 1985.
 Haslund, Henning. MEN AND GODS IN MONGOLIA, National Travel Club, New York, E.P. Dutton & Co., Inc., 1935.
 Heller, Mikhail and Nekrich, Aleksandr M. Utopia in Power: The History of the Soviet Union from 1917 to the Present, Summit Books, 1988.
 Krader, Lawrence. Social Organization of the Mongol-Turkic Pastoral Nomads, Indiana University Publications, Uralic and Altaic Series, Vol. 20., 1963.
 Khodarkovsky, Michael. Where Two Worlds Met: The Russian State and the Kalmyk Nomads 1600–1771, Cornell University Press, 1992.
 Boris Malyarchuk, Miroslava Derenko, Galina Denisova, Sanj Khoyt, Marcin Wozniak, Tomasz Grzybowski and Ilya Zakharov. Y-chromosome diversity in the Kalmyks at the ethnical and tribal levels
 Loewenthal, Rudolf. THE KALMUKS AND OF THE KALMUK ASSR: A Case in the Treatment of Minorities in the Soviet Union, External Research Paper No. 101, Office of Intelligence Research, Department of State, September 5, 1952.

 Pallas, Peter Simon. , 2 vols., St. Petersburg: Akademie der Wissenschaften, 1776.
 Pelliot, Paul. Notes sur le Turkestan, T'oung Pao, XXVII, 1930.
 Poppe, Nicholas N. The Mongolian Language Handbook, Center for Applied Linguistics, 1970.
 Pozdneev, A.M. Kalmytskoe Verouchenie, Entsiklopedicheskii Slovar Brokgauz-Efrona, XIV, St. Petersburg, 1914.
 Riasanovsky, V.A. Customary Law of the Mongol Tribes (Mongols, Buriats, Kalmucks), Harbin, 1929.
 Ulanov, Mergen; Badmaev, Valeriy and Holland, Edward. Buddhism and Kalmyk Secular Law in the Seventeenth to Nineteenth Centuries, Inner Asia 19(2), 2017, pp. 297–314. URL: http://booksandjournals.brillonline.com/content/journals/10.1163/22105018-12340092
 Williamson, H.N.H. FAREWELL TO THE DON: The Russian Revolution in the Journals of Brigadier H.N.H. Williamson, John Harris, Editor, The John Day Company, New York, 1970.
 Wang Jinglan, Shao Xingzhou, Cui Jing et al. Anthropological survey on the Mongolian Tuerhute tribe in He shuo county, Xinjiang Uigur autonomous region // Acta anthropologica sinica. Vol. XII, No. 2. May, 1993. pp. 137–146.

 Санчиров В. П. О Происхождении этнонима торгут и народа, носившего это название // Монголо-бурятские этнонимы: cб. ст. – Улан-Удэ: БНЦ СО РАН, 1996. C. 31–50.
  Galushkin S.K., Spitsyn V.A., Crawford M.H. Genetic Structure of Mongolic-speaking Kalmyks // Human Biology, December 2001, v.73, no. 6, pp. 823–834.
  Хойт С.К. Генетическая структура европейских ойратских групп по локусам ABO, RH, HP, TF, GC, ACP1, PGM1, ESD, GLO1, SOD-A // Проблемы этнической истории и культуры тюрко-монгольских народов. Сборник научных трудов. Вып. I. Элиста: КИГИ РАН, 2009. с. 146–183.
 Хойт С.К. [hamagmongol.narod.ru/library/khoyt_2008_r.htm Антропологические характеристики калмыков по данным исследователей XVIII–XIX вв.] // Вестник Прикаспия: археология, история, этнография. No. 1. Элиста: Изд-во КГУ, 2008. с. 220–243.
 Хойт С.К. [hamagmongol.narod.ru/library/khoyt_2012_r.htm Калмыки в работах антропологов первой половины XX вв]. // Вестник Прикаспия: археология, история, этнография. No. 3, 2012. с. 215–245.
 Хойт С.К. Этническая история ойратских групп. Элиста, 2015. 199 с. (Khoyt S.K. Ethnic history of oyirad groups. Elista, 2015. 199 p). (in Russian)
 Хойт С.К. Данные фольклора для изучения путей этногенеза ойратских групп // Международная научная конференция «Сетевое востоковедение: образование, наука, культура», 7-10 декабря 2017 г.: материалы. Элиста: Изд-во Калм. ун-та, 2017. с. 286–289.

External links
Minorityrights.org
 The Construction of a Yurt
 Khoshotovsky Monastery Reconstruction Project
 "Carte de Tartarie," by Guillaume de L'Isle (1675–1726). From the Map Collection of the Library of Congress
 Kalmyk-Oirat: A Language of Russia (Europe)
 BBC News Regions and Territories: Kalmykia
 Kalmyk-Oirat: A Language of China
 Kalmyk-Oirat: A Language of Mongolia
 Prayer Profile: The Kalmyk of Russia
 Kalmyk. (2006). Encyclopædia Britannica. Retrieved March 7, 2006.
 History of Kalmykia. Retrieved from Official Web Site of the Government of the Republic of Kalmykia
 Трагедия Великой Степи (Tragedy of Great Steppe) 
 Genetic Evidence for the Mongolian Ancestry of Kalmyks, American Journal of Physical Anthropology, 126 (2005)
 ibid., p7.
 Official Web Site of the Embassy of Republic of Kalmykia at the President of the Russian Federation.
 Dge-lugs-pa. (2006). Encyclopædia Britannica. Retrieved March 6, 2006.
 Tibetan Buddhism. The Columbia Encyclopedia, Sixth Edition.  2001–05. Retrieved March 6, 2006.
 History of Buddhism in West Turkistan
 Europe's biggest Buddhist temple opens in Kalmykia
 Linguistic Lineage for Kalmyk-Oirat
 Kalmyk News Agency
 The proof of business life of Kalmykia
 The Kalmyk between China and Russia
 Norsk Utenrikspolitisk Institutt (NUPI)'s Centre for Russian Studies Kalmykiya page
 Kalmyk Buddhist Temple in Belgrade, Yugoslavia (1929–1944);
 US Library of Congress Country Studies: Russia, The North Caucasus
 Web-Portal of the Interregional Not-for-Profit Organization "The Leaders of Kalmykia"
 Kalmyk Brotherhood Society, Philadelphia, PA
 Kalmyk American Society
 Kalmuck Mongolian Buddhist Center, Howell, NJ 
 Kalmyk tales in Kalmyk language
 Kalmyk names

Ethnic groups in Kyrgyzstan
Kalmyk people
Buddhism in Russia
Mongol diaspora in Europe
Ethnic groups in Russia